In a Different Light is a 2009 album by the band Everclear. It is the band's first album with label 429 Records. The album features re-recordings of songs from the band's previous albums, performed in a more stripped down and acoustic fashion, as well as two previously unreleased songs, "At the End of the Day" and "Here Comes the Darkness".

In a Different Light was released in the United States on October 6, 2009.

Track listing
 "Everything to Everyone" – 3:18
 (Originally released on the album So Much for the Afterglow.)
 "Wonderful" – 4:21
 (Originally released on the album Songs from an American Movie Vol. One: Learning How to Smile.)
 "At the End of the Day" – 4:40
 (First release, written by Alexakis and performed with Marion Raven)
 "Santa Monica" – 3:54
 (Originally released on the album Sparkle and Fade.)
 "Summerland" – 4:07
 (Originally released on the album Sparkle and Fade.)
 "Here Comes the Darkness" – 4:52
 (First release, leftover track from Welcome to the Drama Club.)
 "Father of Mine" – 3:51
 (Originally released on the album So Much for the Afterglow.)
 "Fire Maple Song" – 4:15
 (Originally released on the album World of Noise.)
 "Rock Star" – 3:19
 (Originally released on the album Songs from an American Movie Vol. Two: Good Time for a Bad Attitude.)
 "Learning How to Smile" – 4:08
 (Originally released on the album Songs from an American Movie Vol. One: Learning How to Smile.)
 "I Will Buy You a New Life" – 4:35
 (Originally released on the album So Much for the Afterglow.)

Bonus tracks
Amazon.com: "Blondes" (acoustic version from Closure EP)
iTunes: "The Swing" (acoustic version from Closure EP)

Personnel
Art Alexakis – lead vocal, lead guitar
Dave French – rhythm guitar, backing vocals
Sam Hudson – bass guitar, backing vocals
Josh Crawley – keyboards, backing vocals
Tommy Stewart – drums, percussion

References

2009 albums
Everclear (band) albums
Albums produced by Art Alexakis
429 Records albums